Second line may refer to:
Second Line (album), a 2021 album by American singer-songwriter Dawn Richard.
Second line (ice hockey), an offensive unit generally composed of second-tier players
Second line (parades), a tradition in brass band parades in New Orleans, Louisiana, as well as an associated traditional dance style
Second Line (shipping line), a shipping line also known as Robert Kermits Red Star Line or New Line
The Second Line, an American jazz magazine

See also
 Line 2 (disambiguation), several transit lines
Second Avenue Line (disambiguation)